Germán Busch is a province in the Santa Cruz Department, Bolivia. Most of the surface is covered by the Pantanal, the largest wetland area in the world.

History
The province was founded on 30 November 1984 by rearranging the provinces of Ángel Sandoval and Chiquitos. It is named after Germán Busch, a former Bolivian military officer who is regarded as a war hero for his role in the Chaco War between Bolivia and Paraguay.

Subdivision
The province is divided into three municipalities which are further subdivided into cantons.

Places of interest
 Otuquis National Park and Integrated Management Natural Area

Provinces of Santa Cruz Department (Bolivia)
Pantanal